is a Japanese romantic comedy manga written and illustrated by Kyō Hatsuki. A film adaptation premiered on 29 August 2009.

References

External links

2004 manga
Kadokawa Shoten manga
Live-action films based on manga
Manga adapted into films
One-shot manga
Romantic comedy anime and manga
Seinen manga
Japanese romantic comedy films